The 2000 Patriot League men's basketball tournament was played at Allan P. Kirby Field House in Easton, Pennsylvania after the conclusion of the 1999–2000 regular season. Lafayette defeated top seed , 87–61 in the championship game, to win its second Patriot League Tournament title. The Leopards earned an automatic bid to the 2000 NCAA tournament as #15 seed in the East region.

Format
All seven league members participated in the tournament, with teams seeded according to regular season conference record. Play began with the quarterfinal round.

Bracket

References

Tournament
Patriot League men's basketball tournament
Patriot League men's basketball tournament
Patriot League men's basketball tournament